The 2013–14 season was AFC Bournemouth's first season in the Football League Championship following their promotion from Football League One the previous year. This season marks the second time they were higher than the Third Division of English football.

Championship data

League table

Result summary

Result by round

Kit

|
|
|

First-team squad

Statistics

|-
!colspan=14|Players currently out on loan:

|-
!colspan=14|Players who left the club during the season:

|}

Goalscorers

Disciplinary record

Contracts

Transfers

Transfers in

 Total income:  – Undisclosed

Loans in

Transfers out

 Total income:  ~ £0

Loans out

Fixtures and results

Pre-season friendlies

Fixtures and results

Championship

League Cup

FA Cup

Overall summary

Summary

Score overview

External links
 A.F.C. Bournemouth Official Site

AFC Bournemouth seasons
AFC Bournemouth